The Military ranks of Uzbekistan are the military insignia used by the Armed Forces of the Republic of Uzbekistan.

Commissioned officer ranks
The rank insignia of commissioned officers.

Other ranks
The rank insignia of non-commissioned officers and enlisted personnel.

References

External links
 

Uzbekistan
Military of Uzbekistan